The Queensland Railways A10 Avonside class locomotive was a class of  steam locomotives operated by the Queensland Railways.

History
In 1864, the Avonside Engine Company, Bristol built four locomotives for the Queensland Railway. After being built they were dismantled and reassembled at North Ipswich Railway Workshops. Originally classified the A class, per Queensland Railway's classification system they were designated the A10 Avonside class in 1890, A representing they had two driving axles, and 10 the cylinder diameter in inches.

One, 3 Lady Bowen, operated the first Queensland Railways service in 1865 between Grandchester and Ipswich. Initially operating on the Southern & Western Railway out of Ipswich, one was transferred to the Central Railway out of Rockhampton in 1867 and the other three to Maryborough in 1879.

Class list

References

Avonside locomotives
Railway locomotives introduced in 1865
A10 Avonside
2-4-0 locomotives
3 ft 6 in gauge locomotives of Australia
Scrapped locomotives